Alex Benvenga (born 30 May 1991) is an Italian footballer who plays as a right back for an amateur side Gallipoli.

Career
Born in Gallipoli, the Province of Lecce, Apulia, Benvenga started his career at Apulia team U.S. Lecce. He was the member of Allievi U16 team in 2006–07 season. Benvenga was promoted to Allievi U17 and the reserve in 2007–08 and 2008–09 respectively. In July 2009 he was sold to Lega Pro Prima Divisione team Varese in co-ownership deal. He spent half season in Berretti reserve league for Varese. In January 2010 he left for Seconda Divisione club Valenzana. He also selected to Prima Div.A representatives in Lega Pro Prima Divisione under-21 Tournament in January 2010, which he won the trophy. In June 2010 Varese acquired all the registration rights from Lecce.

Benvenga's loan was converted to co-ownership deal in 2010–11 season . In June 2011 Varese bought back Benvenga . On 22 July 2011 he left for Pisa in new co-ownership deal. In June 2012 Varese bought back Benvenga again. On 11 July Benvenga left for another third division club Calcio Como in new temporary deal along with Paolo Marchi (loan) and Alessandro Scialpi (co-own) Benvenga made his debut in a friendly against Tottenham and followed by Internazionale.

On 8 August 2020, he moved to Casarano. He left the club in January 2021.

On 20 February 2021, he returned to Fidelis Andria in Serie C.

References

External links
 Football.it Profile 
 
 
 

1991 births
Living people
People from Gallipoli, Apulia
Sportspeople from the Province of Lecce
Footballers from Apulia
Italian footballers
Association football defenders
Serie A players
Serie C players
Lega Pro Seconda Divisione players
Serie D players
U.S. Lecce players
S.S.D. Varese Calcio players
Valenzana Mado players
Pisa S.C. players
Como 1907 players
Forlì F.C. players
A.C.R. Messina players
S.S.D. Lucchese 1905 players
S.S.D. Città di Campobasso players
S.S. Fidelis Andria 1928 players
Taranto F.C. 1927 players
A.S.D. Gallipoli Football 1909 players